The Bees' Buzz is a 1929 American film directed by Mack Sennett.

Cast
Harry Gribbon as Homer Ashcraft
Andy Clyde as Peggy's father
Barbara Leonard as Peggy
Tyler Brooke as Peggy's suitor
Vernon Dent as Jim
Ruth Kane as A party guest
Billy Gilbert

External links

1929 films
Mack Sennett Comedies short films
1920s English-language films
American black-and-white films
1929 comedy films
American comedy short films
Films directed by Mack Sennett
1920s American films